Emilio Nico Gay (born 14 April 2000) is an English cricketer who plays for Northamptonshire. Born in Bedford, Bedfordshire, England on 14 April 2000 in a family of Caribbean ancestry, Gay was educated at the Bedford School.

He made his first-class debut on 23 September 2019, for Northamptonshire in the 2019 County Championship. In June 2021, during the 2021 County Championship, Gay scored his maiden century in first-class cricket, with 101 runs against Kent. He made his Twenty20 debut on 18 July 2021, for Northamptonshire in the 2021 T20 Blast. He made his List A debut on 25 July 2021, for Northamptonshire  in the 2021 Royal London One-Day Cup.

References

External links
 

2000 births
Living people
English cricketers
Northamptonshire cricketers
People from Bedford
English cricketers of the 21st century
Black British sportspeople
English people of West Indian descent